The  Indianapolis Colts season was the franchise's 62nd season in the National Football League and the 31st in Indianapolis. It also marked the third season under head coach Chuck Pagano, general manager Ryan Grigson, and quarterback Andrew Luck.

The Colts entered the 2014 season as the defending AFC South champions, after compiling an 11–5 record during the previous season and falling to the New England Patriots in the divisional round of the playoffs. They clinched their second straight division title with a 17–10 win over the Houston Texans in Week 15. They also went 6–0 in their division for the second straight year. In the postseason, the Colts would defeat both the Cincinnati Bengals and Denver Broncos before losing to the eventual Super Bowl Champion New England Patriots in the AFC Championship Game. The 2014 Colts failed to join the 2010 New York Jets and 2012 Baltimore Ravens as the only teams to beat both Tom Brady and Peyton Manning in the playoffs.

Behind former first overall draft pick Andrew Luck, the Colts became the first team since the 1970 AFL-NFL Merger to pass for 300 or more yards in eight consecutive games.

As of 2022, this is the deepest postseason run the Colts have ever had in the post-Peyton Manning era, and the only season since 2009 where they have made the AFC Championship Game. This also represents the most recent AFC South title for the Colts.

Draft

Draft trades
 The Colts traded their original seventh-round selection (No. 241 overall) to the St. Louis Rams in exchange for cornerback Josh Gordy.
 The Colts acquired this seventh-round selection (No. 232 overall) in a trade that sent center A. Q. Shipley to the Baltimore Ravens.

Roster moves

Departures

Additions

Undrafted free agents

Suspensions

Robert Mathis
On May 16, it was announced the outside linebacker Robert Mathis was suspended for the first four games of the season for violating the league's substance-abuse policy. It was reported that Mathis took the drug Clomid, a male fertility drug. Greg Aiello, a spokesperson for the league said that the drug was not approved for fertility use in males by the FDA and has been banned by the league for years. It was announced on May 20 that the league would not hear Mathis' appeal on the suspension.

LaRon Landry
On September 29, it was announced the safety LaRon Landry was suspended for four games of the season for violating the league's substance-abuse policy.

Injuries
 July 25: Running back Vick Ballard suffered a torn left Achilles tendon on the second day of training camp and was later placed on the injured reserve.
 July 31: Left guard Donald Thomas suffered a torn right quad during training camp, which required season ending surgery.
 September 8: Outside linebacker Robert Mathis suffered a torn Achilles tendon during a personal workout. Mathis, who was suspended the first four game of the season, was later placed on the injured reserve and ruled out for the remainder of the season.

Staff/Coaches

Final roster

Schedule

Preseason

Regular season

Note: Intra-division opponents are in bold text.

Postseason

Game summaries

Regular season

Week 1: at Denver Broncos

The Colts began the season on the road against the defending AFC champion Denver Broncos. The Colts began the game on offense, driving down to the Broncos' 36-yard line. However, following a delay of game penalty, they were forced to punt. Peyton Manning led the Broncos' offense on a 16-play drive, but would settle only for a field goal, giving Denver a 3–0 lead. An Andrew Luck interception on the Colts' ensuing offensive possession set the Broncos up at midfield and would lead to a touchdown on a pass from Manning to Julius Thomas to give the Broncos a 10–0 lead. After a three and out from the Colts' offense, Manning and the Broncos again take advantage and drive 83-yard to score on another Thomas touchdown reception. Late in the second quarter, the Broncos again scored on a touchdown pass from Manning to Thomas and extended Denver's lead to 24–0 with two minutes remaining in the half. The Colts put together an 8-play, 80-yard drive to end the half and scored their first points on a 9-yard run from Luck, making the score 24–7 in favor of Denver at halftime.

The Broncos' began the second half on offense, though they were eventually forced to punt. After driving into the red zone on their first offensive possession of the half, the Colts' failed to convert a fourth down on the goal line and turned the ball over on downs. The Colts' next offensive possession would again stall in the red zone, with the Colts settling for an Adam Vinatieri field goal, cutting the Bronco lead to 24–10. A 48-yard drive early in the fourth quarter gave the Broncos as 31–10 lead after a Montee Ball touchdown run. The Colts would respond on their next drive with a touchdown pass from Luck to Dwayne Allen, cutting the Broncos' lead down to two scores. The Colts failed to take advantage of a recovered onside kick, after Luck threw an interception in Broncos' territory. After the Colts defense forced a three and out, Luck again drove the Colts down to the goal line, eventually scoring on a touchdown pass to Hakeem Nicks. After again stopping the Broncos' offense, the Colts received the ball with a little under three minutes remaining in the game and a change to tie the game. Though the Colts would drive into Bronco territory, the drive would end after a failed fourth down pass attempt from Luck to Reggie Wayne. With the loss, the Colts began the season with an 0–1 record.

Week 2: vs. Philadelphia Eagles

After losing to the Broncos in the season opener, the Colts faced the Philadelphia Eagles in their first home game of the season on Monday night. After a three and out on the Colts' opening possession, the Eagles, led by quarterback Nick Foles, drove down the field and settled for a 31-yard field goal to give them an early 3–0 lead. On their ensuing offensive drive, the Colts drove 72 yards in nine plays and scored on an Andrew Luck touchdown pass to Ahmad Bradshaw, giving the Colts their first lead at 7–3. The Colts extended their lead early in the second quarter on a 46-yard Adam Vinatieri field goal to 10–3. Later in the second quarter, the Eagles closed the gap after a 23-yard field goal from Cody Parkey. The next Colts possession ended in a Luck touchdown pass to Jack Doyle, extending their lead to 17–6 at halftime.

The Colts scored on their second offensive possession of the third quarter, with a field goal from Vinatieri, giving the Colts a two possession lead at 20–6. Philadelphia responded on their next drive after driving 80 yards in seven plays and scoring on 1-yard touchdown run from LeSean McCoy, making the score 20–13. After a fumble by running back Trent Richardson on the Colts next offensive possession, set up the Eagles to tie the game on a 19-yard touchdown run from Darren Sproles.  On the first possession of the fourth quarter, the Colts offense drive 80 yards to reclaim the lead on a pass from Luck to Bradshaw and giving the Colts a 27–20 lead. The Colts failed to put away the Eagles, after Luck threw an interception during a play that involved a controversial no-call penalty on the Colts next offensive drive, which set up a five play drive, that allowed the Eagles to tie the game at 27–27. After a three and out on the next Colts possession, the Eagles took possession of the ball at their own forty yard line. Foles and the Eagles offense drove 42 yards to the Colts 18 yard line, with Parkey hitting a 36-yard field goal as time expired, which gave the Eagles the 30–27 victory. With the loss, the Colts dropped to 0–2 for only the third time since 1998.

Week 3: at Jacksonville Jaguars

After back-to-back losses to begin the season, the Colts faced their AFC South rival, the Jacksonville Jaguars. The Colts opened the game on offense and put together a twelve play, 50-yard drive that ended in an Adam Vinatieri field goal, giving the Colts an early 3–0 lead. Following a three and out forced by the Colts defense, Andrew Luck again drove the offense down the field, this time scoring on a touchdown throw Ahmad Bradshaw, extending the Colts' lead to 10–0 at the end of the first quarter. The Colts again extended their lead early in the second quarter on a pass from Luck to Dwayne Allen. The Jaguars were again stopped by the Colts defense on their next offensive possession, with the Colts defense preventing the Jaguars for converting a first down on their first three possessions. The Colts' offense, though they would deep into Jaguars' territory, were forced to settle for Vinatieri field goals on their next two offensive possessions, giving them a 23–0 lead. After a fumble recovery by Darius Butler late in the first half, they were set up with good field position in Jaguars territory. A Luck touchdown pass to Coby Fleener extended the Colts' lead to 30–0 at halftime.

After struggling to move the ball in the first half, the Jaguars replaced quarterback Chad Henne with rookie Blake Bortles. The Jaguars were able to convert a first down on their first drive of the half, though they were forced to punt following a penalty that sent them back to midfield. On the Jaguars' next possession, they again drove into Colts' territory, enough to get their first points of the game on a 41-yard field goal from Josh Scobee. At the end of the third quarter, the Colts continued to hold a commanding 30–3 lead. The Colts scored their first points of the second half on a pass from Luck to Hakeem Nicks early in the fourth quarter. Bortles threw his first career touchdown pass on the Jaguars' next possession, throwing it to Allen Hurns. With the large lead late in the game, the Colts replaced Luck with backup quarterback Matt Hasselbeck. Late in the fourth quarter the Colts defense extended the lead, with an interception returned for a touchdown by Greg Toler. A Bortles pass to Cecil Shorts III was the last scoring play of the game, giving the Colts the 44–17 win.

At the end of the game, Andrew Luck completed 31 of 39 pass attempts for 370 yards and four touchdown passes, which earned him the honor of AFC Offensive Player of the Week. The game marked the first win of the season for the Colts and improved their overall record to 1–2.

As of 2022, this remains the last time the Colts defeated the Jaguars in Jacksonville.

Week 4: vs. Tennessee Titans

Following their first win of the season, the Colts faced another divisional rival in the Tennessee Titans. After being forced to punt on their first offensive drive, the Colts' defense forced a fumble that was recovered by Ricky Jean-Francois and set up the Colts inside Titan territory. After a 37-yard pass from quarterback Andrew Luck to T. Y. Hilton set the Colts up at the one yard line, Trent Richardson scored on the next play, putting the Colts up 7–0. An onside kick gave the ball back to the Colts, which led to an eleven play, 44-yard drive that ended in a touchdown pass from Luck to Dwayne Allen. The Colts' defense again forced a turnover on the Titans' next possession, with Charlie Whitehurst throwing an interception to Mike Adams. Luck and the Colts' offense again drove down the field, though this time having to settle for a field goal, extending the lead to 17–0. Tennessee scored their first points midway through the second quarter on a Ryan Succop. The Colts responded on their next possession with a 30-yard field goal from Adam Vinatieri. A Luck interception late in the half, set up the Titans in Colts' territory and allowed them to score on a pass from Whitehurst to Delanie Walker, cutting the Colts' lead to 20–10 at halftime.

The Colts' scored on their first offensive possession of the second half, on a 28-yard touchdown pass from Luck to Reggie Wayne and then later in the quarter on a pass from Luck to Coby Fleener, extending the Colts' lead to 34–10. Tennessee responded with an eight play, 80-yard drive that ended with a touchdown run from Bishop Sankey. Luck completed his fourth touchdown pass of the game early in the fourth quarter, this time on a 15-yard pass to Ahmad Bradshaw, giving the Colts a 41–17 lead. Late in the game, Adams again forced another turnover, with Zach Mettenberger throwing the interception.

During the game, Reggie Wayne caught seven passes for 119 yards and one touchdown, which was enough to move him to seventh on the NFL all-time receptions list and tenth on the most receiving yards list. With the win, the Colts improved to 2–2.

Week 5: vs. Baltimore Ravens

Following back to back wins over division rivals, the Colts' returned to Lucas Oil Stadium to face the Baltimore Ravens. Andrew Luck and the Colts' offense drove 59 yards on their first offensive possession, with the drive ending on a turnover after the Colts failed to convert a fourth down. On the first play of the Ravens' offensive possession, Steve Smith fumbled the ball, which was then recovered by Montori Hughes of the Colts. The Colts settled for a 38-yard field goal by Adam Vinatieri, giving then an early 3–0 lead. A muffed punt return by Jacoby Jones resulted in a second Ravens' turnover, however, on the ensuing Colts' drive, Haloti Ngata intercepted Luck, their first turnover of the game. After a stalled Ravens' drive early in the second quarter, the Colts drove 70 yards in 20 plays, though they again settled for a Vinatieri. The Ravens responded, scoring on a 52-yard field goal from Justin Tucker as time expired, cutting the Colts' lead to 6–3 at halftime.

The Ravens opened the second half on offense and committed their third turnover on a Joe Flacco interception by Vontae Davis. The Colts' took advantage of the turnover, by scoring their first touchdown on a Luck touchdown pass from Dwayne Allen, giving them a 13–3 lead. The Ravens' defense again stepped up later in the third quarter, forcing the Colts' second turnover on a Luck interception by C.J. Mosley, which resulted in a second Tucker field goal. The Colts again extended their lead early in the fourth quarter on a Luck touchdown run, which gave the Colts a two possession lead at 20–6. The Ravens closed the gap again on their ensuing possession, Justin Forsett 11-yard touchdown run, cutting the lead back to one possession. After driving down to the Ravens' 10-yard line, Colts running back Ahmad Bradshaw fumbled the ball, giving the Ravens possession with under two minutes remaining in the game. The Colts' defense forced a turnover on downs and sealed the 20–13 win. With the win, the Colts improved to 3–2.

Week 6: at Houston Texans

Following three straight wins, the Colts traveled to NRG Stadium for a divisional matchup against the Houston Texans on Thursday Night Football. The Colts' defense forced a three and out on the first possession of the game. The Colts settled for a 27-yard Adam Vinatieri field goal to give them a 3–0 lead. Following a recovered onside kick by the Colts, the Colts scored in two plays on a Trent Richardson touchdown run. On the Colts' next offensive drive, they scored on a touchdown pass from Andrew Luck to Ahmad Bradshaw, extending their lead to 17–0. A Coby Fleener touchdown pass from Luck capped off the first quarter, with the Colts leading 24–0. After failing to convert a first down the entire first quarter, the Texans moved the chains on their first possession of the second quarter, and following an 11-play drive, scored their first points on a touchdown pass from Ryan Fitzpatrick to Andre Johnson. Houston linebacker Justin Tuggle intercepted Luck on the Colts' next offensive possession, which set up a 3-play, 26-yard drive that ended with an Arian Foster touchdown run, closing Colts' lead to 24–14. The Colts responded with a 15-play drive that ended in a Vinatieri field goal, and extended their lead to 27–14 going into halftime.

The Texans scored the first points on the second half on their offensive possession, scoring on another Foster touchdown run, which cut the Colts lead to one possession. Luck and the Colts responded on their ensuing possession, driving 80 yards and scoring on a 33-yard touchdown pass from Luck to T. Y. Hilton. After a failed two-point conversion attempt, the Colts led 33–21 at the end of the third quarter. Midway through the fourth quarter, Texans' defensive end J. J. Watt forced a fumble that was returned for 45-yards for a touchdown and again closing the Colts' lead to one possession. Fumbles on the two ensuing Texan possessions ensured the Colts' 33–28 win.

Punter Pat McAfee was recognized for his league best 44.8 yard punt average, as well as his third successful onside kick of the season, by being named the AFC Special Teams Player of the Week. With the win, the Colts improved to 4–2, winning four straight games, as well as their tenth straight win within the division, dating back to the 2012 season.

Week 7: vs. Cincinnati Bengals

The Colts franchise reached its 500th win, counting regular season and playoffs.

Week 8: at Pittsburgh Steelers

Week 9: at New York Giants

Week 11: vs. New England Patriots

Week 12: vs. Jacksonville Jaguars

Week 13: vs. Washington Redskins

Week 14: at Cleveland Browns

Week 15: vs. Houston Texans

With the win, the Colts clinched the AFC South title for a second consecutive season while improving to 10–4 and 13–0 against the Texans at home.

Week 16: at Dallas Cowboys

Week 17: at Tennessee Titans

With the win, the Colts finished the season 11–5 for the third straight year, good enough for the AFC's #4 seed. This would be their 13th straight win over a division rival as they improved to 16–2 against divisional opponents overall under Andrew Luck.

Postseason

AFC Wild Card Playoffs: vs. #5 Cincinnati Bengals

AFC Divisional Playoffs: at #2 Denver Broncos

AFC Championship: at #1 New England Patriots

Standings

Division

Conference

References

External links
 

Indianapolis
Indianapolis Colts seasons
AFC South championship seasons
Indianapolis Colts Season